Canada has competed at every edition of the Pan American Games since the second edition of the multi-sport event in 1955. As of the last Pan American Games in 2019, Canada is third on the all time medals list, only behind the United States and Cuba. Canada is also one of nine countries to have competed at the only Winter Pan American Games, and only of one two (the other being the United States) to win a medal at the games.

Medal count 

To sort the tables by host city, total medal count, or any other column, click on the  icon next to the column title.

Summer 

Notes
  Some sources appoint 7 gold medals, 21 silver medals and 28 bronze medals, instead of 5, 19 and 24, respectively. This would result in a total of 56 medals earned during the 1959 Games, instead of 48.
  Some sources appoint 10 gold medals and 25 bronze medals, instead of 11 and 26, respectively. This would result in a total of 62 medals earned during the 1963 Games, instead of 64.
  Some sources appoint 12 gold medals, 37 silver medals and 43 bronze medals, instead of 17, 39 and 50, respectively. This would result in a total of 92 medals earned during the 1967 Games, instead of 106.
  Some sources appoint 42 bronze medals, instead of 41. This would result in a total of 81 medals earned during the 1971 Games, instead of 80.
  Some sources appoint 18 gold medals and 38 bronze medals, instead of 19 and 40, respectively. This would result in a total of 94 medals earned during the 1975 Games, instead of 91.
  Some sources appoint 70 bronze medals, instead of 71. This would result in a total of 137 medals earned during the 1979 Games, instead of 138.
  Some sources appoint 22 gold medals, 42 silver medals and 55 bronze medals, instead of 18, 44 and 47, respectively. This would result in a total of 119 medals earned during the 1983 Games, instead of 109.
  Some sources appoint 57 silver medals, instead of 56. This would result in a total of 162 medals earned during the 1987 Games, instead of 161.
  Some sources appoint 41 bronze medals, instead of 42. This would result in a total of 127 medals earned during the 2003 Games, instead of 128.
  According to those sources, the historical medal table for Canada counts 455 gold medals, 655 silver medals and 802 bronze medals, instead of 456, 656 and 801, respectively. This would result in a total number of 1912 Pan American medals.

Winter

Medals by sport

Summer
Canadians have won medals in most of the current Summer Pan American sports.

As of the conclusion of the 2019 Pan American Games

Winter

Best results in non-medaling sports:

Flag bearers

Opening ceremonies
Flag bearers carry the national flag of their country at the opening ceremony of the Pan American Games.

References

Canada at multi-sport events